Liverpool Exchange was a borough constituency within the city of Liverpool in England, centred on Liverpool Exchange railway station.  It returned one Member of Parliament (MP) to the House of Commons of the Parliament of the United Kingdom, elected by the first past the post system.

The constituency was created under the Redistribution of Seats Act 1885 for the 1885 general election.  It was abolished for the February 1974 election, when it was merged with Liverpool Scotland to form Liverpool Scotland Exchange.

Boundaries 
The constituency covered the centre of the city of Liverpool, bordering on the River Mersey. It included the commercial area of the city, as well as poorer housing. It originally consisted of the wards of Vauxhall, St Ann Street, Lime Street, Exchange, and St Paul's.

1885–1918 
The Exchange Ward, with a significant Conservative business vote, was combined with the St Anne's and Vauxhall wards (which were more Liberal and contained a substantial Irish vote).

The Scotland division, to the north of this seat, was more heavily Irish and returned an Irish Nationalist MP. Exchange was a Liberal/Conservative and Allies marginal constituency and its elections were influenced by what guidance the electors were given by Nationalist leaders.

1918–1950 
In this period the seat was defined as comprising the Abercromby, Castle Street, Exchange, Great George, St Anne's, St Peter's, and Vauxhall wards.

In this era the area was represented by Conservative Members of Parliament, until the Labour Party captured the seat in 1945.

1950–1955 
Brunswick, and Granby wards were added to those previously in the seat.

1955–1974 
The constituency comprised Abercromby, Central, Granby, Low Hill, and St James wards.

In the redistribution which took effect in 1974, this seat disappeared. However the successor constituency was named Liverpool Scotland Exchange, combining as it did the central and northern riverside parts of the city.

Members of Parliament

Election results

Elections in the 1880s 

 O'Shea had originally announced his intention to stand as an Irish Nationalist candidate. When he later secured the support of the Liberal Party, Stephens retired in favour of him.

Duncan's death caused a by-election.

Elections in the 1890s 

Bigham is appointed a judge on the Queen's Bench division of the High Court of Justice, and resigned.

Elections in the 1900s

Elections in the 1910s 

General Election 1914–15:

Another General Election was required to take place before the end of 1915. The political parties had been making preparations for an election to take place and by the July 1914, the following candidates had been selected; 
Unionist: Leslie Scott
Liberal:

Elections in the 1920s

Elections in the 1930s 

General Election 1939–40
Another General Election was required to take place before the end of 1940. The political parties had been making preparations for an election to take place and by the Autumn of 1939, the following candidates had been selected; 
Conservative: John Shute
Labour:

Elections in the 1940s

Elections in the 1950s

Elections in the 1960s

Elections in the 1970s

References

See also
Liverpool Riverside
 

Parliamentary constituencies in North West England (historic)
Exchange
Constituencies of the Parliament of the United Kingdom established in 1885
Constituencies of the Parliament of the United Kingdom disestablished in 1974